Lake Bemidji State Park is a state park of Minnesota, United States, on the north shore of  Lake Bemidji. The northern half of the park preserves a spruce-tamarack bog. A district of National Park Service rustic structures built by the Civilian Conservation Corps and National Youth Administration in the 1930s is on the National Register of Historic Places.

Geology and landscape 
The landscape in the park is the last stage of the glacier in Minnesota. As the ice melted 10,000 years ago, soil, gravel, and rock were deposited creating the park's rolling topography. Many swamps and bogs were formed when chunks of ice separated from the receding glacier and left depressions which filled with water. Lake Bemidji was created by two huge blocks of ice being left behind by the retreating glacier.

The present landscape is not fixed. The land continues to change slowly due to the erosion by wind and water, shoreline wave action, and other acts of mother nature.

History 
For hundreds of years, ancestors to the Dakota people fished and hunted around Lake Bemidji. Around 1750 the Anishinabe settled. The Anishinabe called the lake "Bemiji-gau-maug" meaning "cutting sideways through" or diagonally. This was a reference to the path of the Mississippi River through the lake. Later Europeans, unable to pronounce the Anishinabe name, simply referred to it as "Bemidji".

In the late 19th century, European immigrants migrated to this region to harvest the white and Norway pine trees. During the peak of logging, the lumber mill on the south shore of Lake Bemidji was the center of logging in the nation. When the government purchased the land, a few areas within the park boundaries were in a virgin state, preserving the towering forests. In 1923, the Minnesota State Legislature set aside , establishing Lake Bemidji State Park.

Wildlife 
The vegetation in the park supports many wildlife species. Birding is popular. Campers may hear the sounds of red-eyed and warbling vireos, rose-breasted grosbeaks, and many other song birds. Loons, eagles, herons, gulls, even osprey can be seen by the lakeshore. A hike on one of the park trails can yield a glimpse of a doe with her fawn, a porcupine having lunch halfway up a jackpine, or even an occasional black bear. Eastern chipmunks and red squirrels also adapt to the park's recreational areas.

In the wetland areas of the park, waterfowl, beaver, muskrat, and mink can be found. In the evening, the park is filled with sounds of gray treefrogs, spring peepers, and chorus and wood frogs. The woodland sound of a barred owl, the flute-like song of the veery, and the hammering of a sapsucker all add to the wilderness experience.

In all, nearly 50 species of mammals and almost 200 different kinds of birds can be seen throughout the year in Lake Bemidji State Park. Contact the park naturalist for current information on where and when to observe the variety of wildlife.

Recreation 
Lake Bemidji State Park offers recreational activities year round. Activities include camping, hiking, biking, cross country skiing, snowmobiling, snowshoeing, picnicking, swimming, volleyball, fishing, boating and interpretive programs.

Camping
The park has 95 drive-in sites, including 43 electric sites, 4 pull-through sites, and 4 handicapped accessible sites. In winter, only one site is available to drive-in. This is a non-electric site. Other sites are available on a walk-in basis after deep snow cover.

Two group camp sites are available. Bass Creek is a tent-only group camp that can accommodate up to 30 people. Water is available in the nearby parking area. The North Group Camp site accommodates up to 50 people and has three spaces for small trailers or pick-up campers. The group camps are available in winter but access is on foot. For group camp reservations, contact the state park reservation service at 1-866-85PARKS or online at www.stayatmnparks.com.

Trails

The course for the Bemidji Blue Ox Marathon, first run in October 2013, travels through the park on the paved trails.

Showshoes can be rented at the park office.

Recreational facilities
In the summer, park visitors can use the lakefront picnic and beach area which has picnic tables, an enclosed shelter with a fireplace, a volleyball court, a shower, restrooms, and pedestal grills. The shelter building and the sanitation building in the park were built by the Civilian Conservation Corps and the National Youth Administration, and are of rustic style log construction.  These buildings are now listed on the National Register of Historic Places. The Shelter can be reserved by calling the park office.

There is a boat landing located next to the picnic area for those that wish to go fishing or boating. Canoes and fishing boats are available for rent from May 10 through October 13. There is also a handicapped accessible fishing pier.

In the winter, snowshoes are available for rent at the park office. Or, visitors can park in the picnic area parking lot, bring their own ice fishing equipment, and walk onto the lake to go fishing. There is a warming house located in the Trail Center, in the park's Visitor Center

Naturalist and interpretive programs
Throughout the year, the Visitor Center is a place where information about the park's trails, animals, geology, and other interesting features can be found through exhibits, films or slide programs. A complete list of programs and special programs or organized groups is available upon request.

Naturalist programs are offered Wednesday through Sunday from mid-June through Labor Day. Fall, winter and spring programs are generally offered on weekends. The Interpretive Center is open for schools, scouts and other community organizations upon request. Programs focus on the lake and wetland environments found in the park.

Interpretive programs in the summer include, morning hikes, boat tours of Lake Bemidji, evening films, and campfire talks. Winter programs include snowshoeing, candlelight skiing, and animal tracking. The Visitor Center is open daily and sometimes serves as a gathering place for interpretive programs where visitors share experiences by the warmth of the woodstove.

Images

Sources 

 DNR Website
 Lake Bemidji State Park Flyer. (12/2007). State of Minnesota, Department of Natural Resources
 Rustic Style Resources in Minnesota State Parks
 National Register of Historic Places Registration Form

References

External links

Lake Bemidji State Park

1923 establishments in Minnesota
Civilian Conservation Corps in Minnesota
Historic districts on the National Register of Historic Places in Minnesota
Park buildings and structures on the National Register of Historic Places in Minnesota
Protected areas established in 1923
Protected areas of Beltrami County, Minnesota
Protected areas on the Mississippi River
National Park Service rustic in Minnesota
State parks of Minnesota
National Register of Historic Places in Beltrami County, Minnesota
National Youth Administration